Sei Kawahara (born December 17, 1995) is a Japanese figure skater. He won one medal on the ISU Junior Grand Prix series and made his Grand Prix debut at the 2015 Skate Canada International.

Post–competitive career 
Kawahara works as a coach and choreographer. He also coaches women's figure skaters Kaori Sakamoto and Mai Mihara.

Programs

Competitive highlights 
GP: Grand Prix; CS: Challenger Series; JGP: Junior Grand Prix

References

External links 
 

1995 births
Japanese male single skaters
Living people
People from Kurume
Competitors at the 2017 Winter Universiade